Mirzachauki is a village in the Mandro CD block in the Sahibganj subdivision of the Sahibganj district in the Indian state of Jharkhand.

Geography

Location                                           

Overview
Rajmahal coalfield is shown in the map. The entire area is overwhelmingly rural with only small pockets of urbanisation.

Note: The full screen map is interesting. All places marked on the map are linked and you can easily move on to another page of your choice. Enlarge the map to see what else is there – one gets railway links, many more road links and so on.

Demographics
According to the 2011 Census of India, Mirzahauki had a total population of 248, of which 121 (49%) were males and 127 (51%) were females. Population in the age range 0–6 years was 42. The total number of literate persons in Mirzachauki was 79 (38.35% of the population over 6 years).

Civic administration

Police station
Mirzachauki police station serves the Mandro CD block.

Transport
There is a station at Mirzachauki on the Sahibganj Loop.

Education
Government High School Mirzachowki is a Hindi-medium coeducational institution established in 1954. It has facilities for teaching from class I to class X.

Gandhi Adarsh High School Mirzachowki is a Hindi-medium coeducational institution established in 1985. It has facilities for teaching from class VI to class X.

References

Villages in Sahibganj district